Clive James's Postcard from... (sometimes shortened to Postcard(s) from...) was a TV travel documentary series written and presented by Clive James, originally broadcast between 1989 and 1999. In each episode James visited a notable world city, exploring tourist hotspots and commenting on the city's appeal in his trademark wry comic style, as well as conducting interviews with famous inhabitants.

The first six series (1989-1995) were produced by the BBC, while the further 5 episodes (1996-1999) were produced by Watchmaker Productions (co-founded by James) for Carlton Television (ITV franchise). In the United States the show aired on PBS.

In a 1992 interview James said that Postcards was his most personal work. He had previously been a columnist for The Observer newspaper between 1976 and 1983, contributing travel diaries which were later compiled into the book Flying Visits.

Following James's death in November 2019, all 13 episodes of Postcards produced by the BBC were rebroadcast on BBC Four between January and March 2020 (not in chronological order).

Episodes

In the first series (1989), James visited Rio de Janeiro, Chicago and Paris (where he interviewed Beatrice Dalle). In the second series (1990) he visited Miami, Florida, meeting Don Johnson and Gloria Estefan, while other episodes brought him to Rome, Shanghai and Los Angeles. In Rome James talked with Vittorio Mussolini and Leonard Bernstein, while in L.A. he met Dudley Moore and Kirstie Alley. The third series (1991) focused on Sydney and London, the two cities with which James was most associated during his life. Whilst in the latter, he talked with Michael Caine, Victoria Wood, Peter Cook and Terence Donovan. The fourth series (1993) brought James to Cairo, where he met Omar Sharif. In the fifth series (1994) he travelled to New York City (where he met Richard Price and Ivana Trump), while the sixth (1995) took him to Bombay and Berlin (where he interviewed German singer Meret Becker). In 1996 James went to Hong Kong (where he met Maggie Cheung, Chris Patten, Lord Lichfield and Kai Bong Chow). In 1998 he went to Las Vegas, the Melbourne Cup, and Mexico City. In the final episode in 1999 he visited Havana.

Clive James in...

Not to be confused with the Postcard from… series, James had previously made three city-based documentaries under the Clive James in… title for London Weekend Television.  A fourth was made in 1995 by Watchmaker Productions, his first travelogue since moving back to ITV from the BBC.

References

External links
Clive James Official Website

BBC television documentaries
BBC travel television series
1989 British television series debuts
1999 British television series endings
1980s British documentary television series
1990s British documentary television series
1980s British travel television series
1990s British travel television series
Works about cities
Television episodes set in Rio de Janeiro (city)
Television episodes set in Chicago
Television episodes set in Paris
Television episodes set in Miami
Television episodes set in Rome
Television episodes set in Shanghai
Television episodes set in Los Angeles
Television shows set in Sydney
Television episodes set in London
Television shows set in Egypt
Television episodes set in New York City
Television shows set in Mumbai
Television episodes set in Berlin
Television episodes set in Buenos Aires
Television episodes set in Hong Kong
Television episodes set in Dallas
Television episodes set in Las Vegas
Television episodes set in Tokyo
Television episodes set in Cuba
English-language television shows